Corazón que miente (English: Lying Heart) is a Mexican telenovela produced by Mapat L. de Zatarain for Televisa. It is a remake of the telenovela Laberintos de pasión produced in 1999 by Ernesto Alonso. It is created by Caridad Bravo Adams and developed by Cuauhtémoc Blanco and Maria del Carmen Peña. The series originally aired from February 8, 2016  to May 14, 2016.

The series stars Thelma Madrigal as Mariela, Pablo Lyle as Alonso, Diego Olivera as Leonardo, Mayrín Villanueva as Lucía, Alexis Ayala as Daniel, Alejandro Tommasi as Démian, Dulce María as Renata, María Sorté as Carmen and Lourdes Reyes as Rafaela.

Plot 
Mariela Salvatierra is orphaned at the age of 12, after losing her grandfather, Manuel, a death she believes was caused by Démian Ferrer. As his protégé, Mariela leaves the city with Leonardo Del Río, a man who believes that Démian is also the murderer of the death of Lucía, Démian's wife. Fifteen years later, the two return to avenge the deaths of their loved ones while meeting great obstacles: one being that Ferrer is a powerful, unprincipled and perfidious man who not only takes pleasure in others' downfall, but he also does not even care about the well being of his family. Mariela falls in love with Démian's eldest son, Alonso, whom she was friends with as children. Mariela and Alonso have to fight all the external forces that compromise their relationship in order to live their love story.

Cast

Main 
Thelma Madrigal  as Mariela Salvatierra Morán
Pablo Lyle  as Alonso Ferrer Castellanos
Diego Olivera as Leonardo del Río Solórzano
Mayrín Villanueva as Lucía Castellanos Sáenz
Alexis Ayala as Daniel Ferrer Bilbatúa
Alejandro Tommasi as Demián Ferrer Bilbatúa
Dulce María as Renata Ferrer Jáuregui
María Sorté as Carmen Oceguera
Lourdes Reyes as Rafaela del Moral Sáenz

Recurring 
Alejandro Ávila as Rogelio Medina Sánchez
Gerardo Murguía as Eduardo Moliner Arredondo
Eric del Castillo as Manuel Salvatierra Teri
Ricardo Margaleff as Cristian Mena Souza
Alejandra Procuna as Elena Solís Saldívar
Vanesa Restrepo as Denise Shapiro Berlanga
Alejandra Jurado as Amalia González de Valvidia
Jorge Ortín as Noé Valvidia Pérez
Fátima Torre as Leticia "Lety" Valdivia González
Federico Ayos as Santiago Ferrer Castellanos
Emmanuel Palomares as Lisandro Moliner Bustos
David Palacio as Julio Solís Saldívar
Jessica Mas as Karla Bustos de Moliner
Valentina Azouri as  Mariela Salvatierra Morán (young)
Santiago Torres Jaimes as Santiago Ferrer Castellanos (young)
Nikolás Caballero as Alonso Ferrer Castellanos (young)
Monserrat Gim as Leticia "Lety" Valdivia González (young)
Jessica Decote as Florencia Moliner Bustos
Mónica Zorti as Marcia 
Jessica Segura as Cirila Reyes Medina
Benjamín Islas as Mario Preciado
Ricardo Vera as Preciado
Iliana de la Garza as Eva
Ricardo Guerra as Sanabria
Vicente Torres as Ponciano
Helena Rojo as Sara Sáenz de Castellanos

Episodes

Notes

Awards and nominations

References

External links 
 (in Spanish)

Televisa telenovelas
Mexican telenovelas
2016 telenovelas
2016 Mexican television series debuts
Mexican LGBT-related television shows
2016 Mexican television series endings
Spanish-language telenovelas